Keith Wendorf (born 20 December 1949) is a former German curler and a curling coach.

Wendorf began his participation in curling in 1966 at the high school level in New Brunswick. He would go on to graduate from the University of New Brunswick with a BA in 1972.

After 1972 he moved to Germany. During his time in Germany, Keith competed in 7 World Curling Championships (1978-1979, 1981-1985) highlighted by winning a silver medal in 1983.

He was the National Curling Coach of Germany from 1994 to 2002.

In 2002, Keith Wendorf began works at the World Curling Federation as the Director of Competitions and Development. After 16 years he retired at the end of June 2018.

He is married to Susan Wendorf and currently resides in France.

Awards and honours
Colin Campbell Award: 1979, 1983.
World Curling Freytag Award: 1994.
Inducted in World Curling Federation Hall of Fame: 2012 (as Freytag Award winner; one and only German curler in WCF Hall of Fame for today).

Teams

Record as a coach of national teams

References

External links
 

German male curlers
1949 births
Living people
People from East York, Toronto
Curlers from Toronto
Canadian curling coaches
German curling coaches
University of New Brunswick alumni
Canadian emigrants to Germany
Curlers from New Brunswick
Canadian expatriate sportspeople in France